Cerro Tujle (also known as Cerro Tucle or Cerro Tugle) is a mafic volcanic centre in the Central Volcanic Zone of the Andes, Chile. Its eruption products are aphyric.

The crater appears to have formed, after an initial lava flow eruption turned phreatomagmatic. It is embedded in the Tucúcaro Ignimbrite, which overlies an Ordovician basement and Paleozoic-Mesozoic volcanic and Neozoic mixed sediments. There are other volcanic systems in the vicinity.

See also 

 Tilocálar

References 

Volcanoes of Chile
Maars of Chile
Holocene volcanism
Quaternary Chile
Geography of Antofagasta Region
Andean Volcanic Belt